Matteo Martin "Matt" Battaglia (born September 25, 1965) is an American producer, actor and former American football linebacker.

Football career
Battaglia played college football at the University of Louisville. Battaglia played at Louisville as a linebacker from 1983 to 1986 and was named All-American by the Associated Press in 1985, leading the nation in tackles in 1985 & 1986, with 153 and 166 tackles respectively, averaging 15 tackles per game both seasons.  Battaglia broke former All-Pro Otis Wilson's college tackling record and was named Most Valuable Player by his teammates and coaches. Battaglia had a brief career in professional football with the 1987 Philadelphia Eagles and recorded a sack of Chicago Bears quarterback Sean Payton.

Acting and producing

Battaglia is an Emmy winning producer, has co-produced a two time Golden Globe nominated film and has been an actor in over 90 films, network pilots and television shows.

In 2011, he was an executive producer of Last Shot with Judge Gunn, which he sold straight into syndication with 130 episodes in season one. He won an Emmy in June 2012 as Executive Producer for its first season on the air. The show won an Emmy for Outstanding Legal/Courtroom Drama.

Battaglia co-produced the two time Golden Globe-nominated film Brothers, starring Tobey Maguire, Natalie Portman and Jake Gyllenhaal.

Battaglia sold 2 one hour dramas to Fox, in which the studio bought the rights to and financed the costs of the pilot script(s). The first one was Pyrates, in which he was partnered with Oscar winner Ridley Scott's production company Scott Free Productions and producer Tony To. Bad Monkeys received a pilot and script order by Fox Studios and the script was written by writer Jeff Eastin, best known for creating White Collar. He co-produced on the 2009 horror film Kill Theory, directed by Chris Moore.

As a feature film actor in 2017, he wrapped a role in director Tom Shadyac's film Brian Banks with Morgan Freeman and Greg Kinnear portraying the role of legendary football coach Pete Carroll. He acted in Thor where he held the role of Pete. He played as 49er Three, in the Sony Pictures action thriller Half Past Dead with Steven Seagal. He replaced Jean-Claude Van Damme in the lead role of Luc Deveraux in the action movies Universal Soldier II: Brothers in Arms and Universal Soldier III: Unfinished Business. He appeared in Army of One, Kiss of a Stranger, Pendulum and the direct-to-video film Raven.

In television, Battaglia appears in the Netflix series Best.Worst.Weekend.Ever.. In 2017, he appeared in David Lynch's Twin Peaks.

In 2016, he recurred in seven episodes of the Tyler Perry series, Too Close To Home, playing the United States President. Battaglia guest starred as Agent Ward, in Hawaii Five-O. Night Shift saw him portray General Rozenfeld. And in Criminal Minds he was Captain Grant Howard. He appeared on Friends as the fireman boyfriend of Phoebe (played by Lisa Kudrow).

Other notable guest appearances include The Mentalist, as Curtis Nett, The Client List, as Don Jenkins, and in Longmire in 2012. He appeared in two episodes of 24, two episodes of HBO's Big Love, Shark, CSI: NY, Bones, Charmed, JAG, and Sabrina The Teenage Witch.

Personal life
Battaglia married Tina Frazier in 2006; the couple have two children and live in Georgia.

Filmography and other appearances

Film

Television

References

External links

Official Website

1965 births
American football linebackers
American male television actors
Living people
Louisville Cardinals football players
Male actors from Tallahassee, Florida
Philadelphia Eagles players
20th-century American male actors
21st-century American male actors
Players of American football from Tallahassee, Florida
National Football League replacement players